The sovereign of England may refer to:
Sovereign (English coin)
List of English monarchs
List of British monarchs
Monarchy of England
Monarchy of the United Kingdom